Maurice Diot (13 June 1922 – 4 March 1972) was a French professional road bicycle racer. In 1951, he won the Paris–Brest–Paris race of 1200 km in a record time that has not been broken since. He rode in the 1947, 1948, and 1949 Tour de France. He also finished in second place in the 1950 Paris–Roubaix.

Major results

1947
GP d'Espéraza
Tour de France:
Winner stage 20
1949
Paris–Brussels
1950
GP Catox
1951
GP de l'Echo d'Oran
Paris–Brest–Paris
1952
GP du Pneumatique
Montluçon

References

External links 

Official Tour de France results for Maurice Diot

French male cyclists
1922 births
1972 deaths
French Tour de France stage winners
Cyclists from Paris